Anil Ramdas (Paramaribo, 16 February 1958 – Loenen aan de Vecht, 16 February 2012) was a Dutch-Surinamese columnist, correspondent, essayist, journalist, and TV and radio host. He was generally considered the V.S. Naipaul specialist of The Netherlands.

His work has been extensively studied by the author Karin Amatmoekrim.

In 1997 he was awarded the E. du Perron prize for all of his works.

Works

Fiction 
Anil Ramdas published  his autobiographical novel Badal in  February 2011. In the article "A Matter of Identity: Anil Ramdas and His Autobiographical Novel Badal", Kees Snoek writes :

Death
Ramdas committed suicide on 16 February 2012. Dutch Prime Minister Mark Rutte expressed his regret about Ramdas' death in his weekly press conference.

References

External links
 Breaking the ‘otherness’ fixation, an indepth analysis of the context "migration and identity" Anil Ramdas wrote and spoke extensively on.

 Anil Ramdas, a media resource base that lists some works of Anil Ramdas.

Godhra and After: The Role of Media India First Foundation – 6 April 2002

1958 births
2012 deaths
Dutch radio journalists
Dutch television journalists
Dutch columnists
Dutch essayists
Dutch non-fiction writers
Dutch television presenters
Dutch television producers
Dutch radio presenters
Dutch people of Indian descent
Dutch Hindus
People from Paramaribo
Surinamese emigrants to the Netherlands
Suicides in the Netherlands
2012 suicides
Surinamese Hindus